Hugh Alexander McClure Smith (14 April 19028 October 1961) was an Australian public servant and diplomat.

McClure Smith died in October 1961 whilst on posting in Rome, Italy.

References

1902 births
1961 deaths
Ambassadors of Australia to Egypt
Ambassadors of Australia to Italy
Ambassadors of Australia to the Netherlands
University of Geneva alumni